Bonanza is an American Western television series that ran on NBC from September 13, 1959, to January 16, 1973. Lasting 14 seasons and 432 episodes, Bonanza is NBC's longest-running western, the second-longest-running western series on U.S. network television (behind CBS's Gunsmoke), and one of the longest-running, live-action American series. The show continues to air in syndication. The show is set in the 1860s and centers on the wealthy Cartwright family, who live in the vicinity of Virginia City, Nevada, bordering Lake Tahoe. The series initially starred Lorne Greene, Pernell Roberts, Dan Blocker and Michael Landon and later featured (at various times) Guy Williams, David Canary, Mitch Vogel and Tim Matheson. The show is known for presenting pressing moral dilemmas.

The title "Bonanza" is a term used by miners in regard to a large vein or deposit of silver ore, from Spanish bonanza (prosperity) and commonly refers to the 1859 revelation of the Comstock Lode of rich silver ore mines under the town of Virginia City, not far from the fictional Ponderosa Ranch that the Cartwright family operated. The show's theme song, also titled "Bonanza", became a hit song. Only instrumental renditions, without Ray Evans' lyrics, were used during the series' long run.

In 2002, Bonanza was ranked No. 43 on TV Guides 50 Greatest TV Shows of All Time, and in 2013 TV Guide included it in its list of The 60 Greatest Dramas of All Time. The time period for the television series is roughly between 1861 (Season 1) and 1867 (Season 13) during and shortly after the American Civil War, coinciding with the period Nevada Territory became a U.S. state.

During the summer of 1972, NBC aired reruns of episodes from the 1967–1970 period in prime time on Tuesday evening under the title Ponderosa.

Premise 

The show chronicles the weekly adventures of the Cartwright family, headed by the thrice-widowed patriarch Ben Cartwright (Lorne Greene). He had three sons, each by a different wife: the eldest was the urbane architect Adam Cartwright (Pernell Roberts), who built the ranch house; the second was the warm and lovable giant Eric "Hoss" Cartwright (Dan Blocker); and the youngest was the hotheaded and impetuous Joseph, or "Little Joe" (Michael Landon). Via exposition (S01:E01 – "Rose for Lotta") and flashback episodes, each wife was accorded a different ancestry: English (S02:E65 – "Elizabeth My Love"), Swedish (S03:E95 – "Inger My Love"), and French Creole (S04:E120 – "Marie My Love") respectively. The family's cook was Chinese immigrant Hop Sing (Victor Sen Yung). Greene, Roberts, Blocker, and Landon were billed equally; the opening credits would alternate the order among the four stars.

The family lived on a thousand square-mile (2,600 km2) ranch called the Ponderosa on the eastern shore of Lake Tahoe in Nevada opposite California on the edge of the Sierra Nevada range. The vast size of the Cartwrights' land was quietly revised to "half a million acres" (2,000 km2) on Lorne Greene's 1964 song, "Saga of the Ponderosa". The ranch name refers to the pinus ponderosa, (ponderosa pine), common in the West. The nearest town to the Ponderosa was Virginia City, where the Cartwrights would go to converse with Sheriff Roy Coffee (played by veteran actor Ray Teal), or his deputy Clem Foster (Bing Russell).

Bonanza was considered an atypical western for its time, as the core of the storylines dealt less about the range but more with Ben and his three dissimilar sons, how they cared for one another, their neighbors, and just causes.

"You always saw stories about family on comedies or on an anthology, but Bonanza was the first series that was week-to-week about a family and the troubles it went through. Bonanza was a period drama that attempted to confront contemporary social issues. That was very difficult to do on television. Most shows that tried to do it failed because the sponsors didn't like it, and the networks were nervous about getting letters," explains Stephen Battaglio, a senior editor for TV Guide magazine.

Episodes ranged from high drama ("Bushwhacked", episode #392, 1971; "Shanklin", episode #409, 1972) to broad comedy ("Hoss and the Leprechauns", episode #146, 1964; "Mrs. Wharton and the Lesser Breeds", episode #318, 1969; "Caution, Bunny Crossing", episode #358, 1969), and addressed issues such as the environment ("Different Pines, Same Wind", episode #304, 1968), substance abuse ("The Hidden Enemy", episode #424, 1972), domestic violence ("First Love", episode #427, 1972), anti-war sentiment ("The Weary Willies", episode #364, 1970), and illegitimate births ("Love Child", episode #370, 1970; "Rock-A-Bye Hoss", episode #393, 1971). The series sought to illustrate the cruelty of bigotry against: Asians ("The Fear Merchants", episode #27, 1960; "The Lonely Man", episode #404, 1972), African-Americans ("Enter Thomas Bowers", episode #164, 1964; "The Wish", episode #326, 1968; "Child", episode #305, 1969), Native Americans ("The Underdog", episode #180, 1964; "Terror at 2:00", episode #384, 1970), Jews, ("Look to the Stars", episode #90, 1962); Mormons ("The Pursued", episodes #239–40, 1966), the disabled ("Tommy", episode #249, 1966) and little people ("It's a Small World", episode #347, 1968).

Cast 
Though not familiar stars in 1959, the cast quickly became favorites of the first television generation. The order of billing at the beginning of the broadcast appeared to be shuffled randomly each week, with no relation whatsoever to the current episode featured that week. The main cast of actors portraying Cartwrights is listed here in the order of their characters' ages, followed by an array of recurring supporting players:

Lorne Greene – Ben Cartwright 

Born in Ottawa, Ontario, Canada, to Russian-Jewish parents, Lorne Greene was chosen to play widowed patriarch Ben Cartwright. Early in the show's history, he recalls each of his late wives in flashback episodes. A standard practice with most westerns was to introduce some romance but avoid matrimony. Few media cowboys had on-screen wives. Any time one of the Cartwrights seriously courted a woman, she died from a malady, was abruptly slain, or left with someone else.

Greene appeared in all but fourteen Bonanza episodes. Greene was 45 years old at the beginning of the series while Pernell Roberts and Dan Blocker, who portrayed two of his sons, were both 31, only fourteen years younger.

In 2007, a TV Guide survey listed Ben Cartwright as television's #2 favorite dad.

Pernell Roberts – Adam Cartwright 

Pernell Roberts played eldest son Adam, an architectural engineer with a university education. Adam built the impressive ranch house. Despite the show's success, Roberts departed the series after the 1964–65 season (202 episodes) and returned to stage productions, allegedly because of clashes over the show's direction. John Goddard was initially offered the role of Adam Cartwright, but turned it down to star in Johnny Fletcher.

Attempts to replace Adam with Little Joe's maternal half-brother Clay (Barry Coe) and Cartwright cousin Will (Guy "Zorro" Williams), were unsuccessful. Creator David Dortort introduced a storyline that would keep the character of Adam in the mix, but with a lighter schedule. During season five Adam falls for a widow with a young daughter, while making Will Cartwright a central figure. Roberts decided to stay an additional season, so the scripts were quickly revised by having Adam's fiancée and her daughter depart the series prematurely with Guy Williams' Will, with whom she'd fallen in love. It was Landon, not Roberts, who objected to the infusion of any new Cartwrights.

Dan Blocker – Hoss Eric Cartwright 

The nickname was used as a nod to the character's ample girth, an endearing term for "big and friendly", used by his Swedish mother Inger (and Uncle Gunnar). In the Bonanza flashback, his mother names him Eric after her father. To satisfy young Adam, however, Inger and Ben agree to try the nickname Hoss and "see which one sticks." Inger says of the name Hoss: "In the mountain country, that is the name for a big, friendly man." According to a biography, the show's crew found Blocker to be the "least actor-ish as well as the most likeable" cast member. Producer David Dortort said, "Over the years he gave me the least amount of trouble."

In May 1972, Blocker died suddenly from a post-operative pulmonary embolism, following surgery to remove his gall bladder. The producers felt nobody else could continue the role and for the first time a TV show's producers chose to kill off a young major male character (though it had been done twice before with young female leads—in 1956 on Make Room For Daddy, and again in 1963 with The Real McCoys). Not until the TV movie Bonanza: The Next Generation was it explained that Hoss had drowned attempting to save a woman's life.

Michael Landon – Joseph "Little Joe" Cartwright 

The role of "Little Joe" was given to Michael Landon. 
He played guest roles on several TV westerns and attained the title role in I Was a Teenage Werewolf. He portrayed the youngest Cartwright son, whose mother (Felicia in the pilot, and later changed to Marie) was of French Creole descent. Landon began to develop his skills in writing and directing Bonanza episodes, starting with "The Gamble". Most of the episodes Landon wrote and directed were dramas, including the two-hour, "Forever" (1972), which was recognized by TV Guide as being one of television's best specials (November 1993). Landon's development was a bit stormy according to David Dortort, who felt that the actor grew more difficult during the last five seasons the show ran. Landon appeared in all but fourteen Bonanza episodes for its run, a total of 418 episodes.

Beginning in 1962, a foundation was being laid to include another "son" as Pernell Roberts was displeased with his character. In the episode "First Born" (1962), viewers learn of Little Joe's older, maternal half-brother Clay Stafford. The character departed in that same episode, but left an opportunity for a return if needed. This character's paternity is open to debate. In the 1963 flashback episode "Marie, My Love", his father was Jean De'Marigny. Then in 1964, Lorne Greene released the song "Saga of the Ponderosa", wherein Marie's previous husband was "Big Joe" Collins, who dies saving Ben's life. After Ben consoles Marie, the two bond and marry. They choose to honor "Big Joe" by calling their son "Little Joe". So, whether to Stafford, De'Marigny or Collins, Marie Cartwright was previously married. In the last of the three Bonanza TV movies, it is revealed that "Little Joe" had died in the Spanish-American War – a member of the "Rough Riders". Little Joe had a son named Benjamin 'Benj' Cartwright who was played by Landon's real-life son and seen in all three Bonanza TV movies.

Guy Williams – Will Cartwright 

Guy Williams was slated in 1964, the year that Bonanza hit #1 in the ratings, to replace Pernell Roberts upon Roberts' departure, enabling the series to preserve the four-Cartwright format for the run of the series. His character, Ben's nephew Will Cartwright, was introduced and was the lead character in five episodes, receiving "Starring" billing after the four original rotating Cartwrights during his second appearance going forward, but Roberts changed his mind later and decided to stay for one more season, whereupon Williams found himself pushed out of the part; it was rumored that Michael Landon and Lorne Greene felt threatened by the studio initiating a precedent of successfully replacing one heroic leading man Cartwright with a new one, particularly in view of Williams' popularity with viewers. Williams had previously portrayed the titular character in Walt Disney's Zorro television series, and went on to play the lead in Lost in Space, a science fiction television series, after the role in Bonanza ended.

Ray Teal – Sheriff Roy Coffee 

Veteran character actor Ray Teal essayed the role of Sheriff Roy Coffee on 100 episodes from 1960 to 1972. He appeared in more than 250 movies and some 90 television programs during his 37-year career. His longest-running role was as Sheriff Roy Coffee. He had played a sheriff many times in films and television.

Sheriff Coffee was occasionally the focus of a plot as in the episode "No Less a Man" (broadcast March 15, 1964). A gang of thieves has been terrorizing towns around Virginia City and the town council wants to replace Coffee, whom they consider over-the-hill, with a younger sheriff before the gang hits town, not realizing that they'd been spared earlier because the gang's leader was wary of Coffee's longevity and only acquiesced to rob the Virginia City bank after extreme pressure from other gang members. Coffee ends up showing the town that youth and a fast gun don't replace experience.

David Canary – "Candy" Canaday 

After graduating from the University of Cincinnati, David Canary was offered a left-end position with the Denver Broncos, but pursued acting and singing. In 1967, he joined the cast as "Candy" Canaday, a plucky Army brat turned cowboy, who became the Cartwrights' confidant, ranch foreman and timber vessel captain. Dortort was impressed by Canary's talent, but the character vanished in September 1970, after Canary had a contract dispute. He returned two seasons later after co-star Dan Blocker's death, reportedly having been approached by Landon. Canary played the character on a total of 93 episodes. Canary joined the cast in Season 9.

Victor Sen Yung – Hop Sing 

Chinese American character actor Victor Sen Yung, veteran of more than 160 appearances in movies and on television between 1937 and 1970 (including portraying the "#2 son" in the Charlie Chan series after Keye Luke departed), played the Cartwrights' happy-go-lucky cook, whose blood pressure rose when the family came late for dinner. Cast here as the faithful domestic, the comedy relief character had little to do beyond chores. He once used martial arts to assail a towering family foe. Though often referenced, Hop Sing only appeared in an average of eight to nine shows each season. As a semi-regular cast member, Sen Yung was only paid per episode. After 14 years, he was widely known, but making far less than his Ponderosa peers. The Hop Sing character was central in only two episodes: "Mark of Guilt" (#316) and "The Lonely Man" (#404). Bonanza series creator David Dortort told the Archive of American Television that the "Hop Sing" character generated massive fandom - "Victor was just absolutely delightful. He loved the part; he loved doing it. In fact, he began to develop fans, to the extent that I wrote him in as the feature part in a number of shows."

Mitch Vogel – Jamie Hunter/Cartwright 

After Canary's departure in mid-1970, and aware of the show's aging demographic, the writers sought a fresh outlet for Ben's fatherly advice. Fourteen-year-old Mitch Vogel was introduced as Jamie Hunter in  "A Matter of Faith" (season 12, episode 363). Vogel played the red-haired orphan of a roving rainmaker, whom Ben takes in and adopts later in a 1971 episode, called "A Home for Jamie."

Tim Matheson – Griff King 

During the final season, in 1972–73, Tim Matheson portrayed Griff King, a parolee who tries to reform his life as a worker at the Ponderosa Ranch under Ben Cartwright's tutelage.

Lou Frizzell – Dusty Rhodes 

Following Canary's departure, Lou Frizzell's character accompanied Jamie Hunter to the Ponderosa and became the Cartwright's foreman.

Cast episode count 
(Of 432 total episodes)
 Lorne Greene – Ben Cartwright – 418 episodes (Season 1–14)
 Michael Landon – Joseph "Little Joe" Cartwright – 418 episodes (Season 1–14)
 Dan Blocker – Eric "Hoss" Cartwright – 404 episodes (Season 1–13)
 Pernell Roberts – Adam Cartwright – 180 episodes (Season 1–6)
 Victor Sen Yung – Hop Sing – 112 episodes (Season 1–14)
 Ray Teal – Sheriff Coffee – 100 episodes (Season 2–13)
 David Canary – "Candy" Canaday – 93 episodes (Season 9–11, 14)
 Bing Russell – Deputy Clem Foster – 58 episodes (Season 4–6, 8–14)
 Mitch Vogel – Jamie Hunter Cartwright – 46 episodes (Season 12–14)
 Tim Matheson – Griff King – 10 episodes (Season 14)
 Lou Frizzell – Dusty Rhodes – 12 episodes (Season 11–13)
 Betty Endicott – Various – 83 episodes (Season 2–8, 10–11)
 Guy Williams – Will Cartwright – 5 episodes (Season 5)

Episodes

Production

Set and filming 

The opening scene for the first season was shot at Lake Hemet, a reservoir in the San Jacinto Mountains, Riverside County, California, and later moved to Lake Tahoe. During the first season extra horses were rented from the Idyllwild Stables in Idyllwild, also in the San Jacinto Mountains. The first Virginia City set was used on the show until 1970 and was located on a backlot at Paramount and featured in episodes of Have Gun – Will Travel, Mannix, and The Brady Bunch. In the 1970 premiere episode of the 12th season titled "The Night Virginia City Died", Deputy Clem Foster's pyromaniac fiancée levels the town in a series of fires (reflecting a real 1875 fire that destroyed three-quarters of Virginia City). This allowed for a switch to the less expensive Warner studios from September 1970 through January 1973. The script was initially written for the departing David Canary's Candy, but was rewritten for actors Ray Teal (Sheriff Roy Coffee) and Bing Russell (Deputy Clem Foster), who rarely appeared together on the show.

The program's Nevada set, the Ponderosa Ranch house, was recreated in Incline Village, Nevada, in 1967, and remained a tourist attraction until its sale thirty-seven years later in September 2004.

It was partially filmed in Wildwood Regional Park in Thousand Oaks, California.

Costumes 

From the third season on, the Cartwrights and nearly every other recurring character on the show wore the same clothing in almost every episode. The reason for this is twofold: it made duplication of wardrobe easier for stunt doubles (Hal Burton, Bob Miles, Bill Clark, Lyle Heisler, Ray Mazy) and it cut the cost of refilming action shots (such as riding clips in-between scenes), as previously shot stock footage could be reused. Below is a survey of costumes employed:

 Ben Cartwright: Sandy shirt, tawny leather vest, gray pants, cream-colored hat, occasional green scarf.
 Adam Cartwright: Black shirt, black or midnight blue pants, black hat. Elegant city wear. Cream-colored trail coat.
 Hoss Cartwright: White shirt, brown suede vest, brown pants, large beige flat-brimmed, ten-gallon hat.
 Little Joe Cartwright: Beige, light gray shirt, kelly-green jacket, tan pants, beige hat. Black leather gloves from 10th season on. In season 14, he and Greene occasionally wore different shirts and slacks, as the footage of them and the late Dan Blocker together could no longer be reused.
 Candy Canaday: Crimson shirt, black pants, black leather vest, black hat, grey/ pale purple scarf.

It was not unusual for Little Joe Cartwright and Candy Canaday to appear shirtless in various scenes involving manual labor.

The horse saddles used by the Bonanza cast were made by the Bona Allen company of Buford, Georgia.

Hair styles 
In 1968, Blocker began wearing a toupee on the series, as he was approaching age 40 and his hair loss was becoming more evident. He joined the ranks of his fellow co-stars Roberts and Greene, both of whom had begun the series with hairpieces (Greene wore his modest frontal piece in private life too, whereas Roberts preferred not wearing his, even to rehearsals/blocking). Landon was the only original cast member who was wig-free throughout the series, as even Sen Yung wore an attached rattail- queue.

Theme song 
Bonanza features a memorable theme song by Jay Livingston and Ray Evans that was orchestrated by David Rose and arranged by Billy May for the television series. Members of the Western Writers of America chose it as one of the Top 100 Western songs of all time.

The Bonanza theme song opens with a blazing Ponderosa map and saddlebound Cartwrights. The melodic intro, emulating galloping horses, is one of the most recognized television scores. Variations of the theme were used for 12 seasons on the series. Although there were two official sets of lyrics (some country-western singers, avoiding royalties, substituted the copyright renditions with their own words), the series simply used an instrumental theme. Three of the cast members bellowed-out the original lyrics, unaccompanied, at the close of the pilot (Pernell Roberts, the sole professional singer of the quartet, abstained and untethered the horse reins). Before the pilot aired (on September 12, 1959), the song sequence, deemed too campy, was edited out of the scene and instead the Cartwrights headed back to the ranch whooping and howling. In a 1964 song, the Livingston-Evans lyrics were revised by Lorne Greene with a more familial emphasis, "on this land we put our brand, Cartwright is the name, fortune smiled the day we filed the Ponderosa claim" ("Bonanza", Bear Family Boxed set, Disc #2). In 1968, a slightly revamped horn and percussion-heavy arrangement of the original score introduced the series- which was used until 1970. A new theme song, called "The Big Bonanza" was written in 1970 by episode scorer David Rose, and was used from 1970 to 1972. Action-shot pictorials of the cast replaced the galloping trio with the order of the actors rotating from episode to episode, resulting in Blocker or Landon often getting top billing over Greene. Finally, a faster rendition of the original music returned for the 14th and final season, along with action shots of the cast (sans Dan Blocker, who had died by this point).

The theme song has been recorded by numerous artists in a diverse variety of styles. The first recorded and released version was an instrumental by Marty Gold, on his 1960 album Swingin' West. This was followed by the February 1960 single by Buddy Morrow and his Orchestra, which included vocals. Morrow's version also appeared on his 1960 album Double Impact which featured several other then-recent television themes. In December 1960, another vocal version was issued only in the United Kingdom by Johnny Gregory (bandleader) and his Orchestra and Chorus released on the Fontana label. All aforementioned vocal versions, including the television pilot, used lyrics written by Livingston and Evans contained in the first published sheet music for the song, though not all the lyrics were sung. A Bonanza soundtrack album released in late 1961 included a version by David Rose; Rose also had a 1960 single and included the theme on his 1961 album Exodus in a different mix. The biggest hit version is a guitar instrumental by Al Caiola, which reached number 19 on Billboard in 1961. Other versions were released by Billy Vaughn, Valjean, Lorne Greene, Johnny Cash and Nelson Riddle.

Country singer Johnny Cash was first to record a full-length vocal version of the theme song. He and Johnny Western discarded the original Livingston and Evans lyrics, and wrote new ones, though the revised lyrics still make direct reference to the Cartwrights and the Ponderosa. The song first saw release by September 1962 as a single. Sometime after June 1963, it was released as a track on his sixteenth album: Ring of Fire: The Best of Johnny Cash. This version was later covered by Faron Young for his 1963 album Aims at the West. Singer Ralf Paulsen recorded a German-language version of the song in 1963, released in mid-June 1963 on Capitol Records in the United States. His German version (lyrics attributed to "Nicolas") was sung in the same style and mood in which Cash had recorded it, and was fairly close in translation.

Carlos Malcolm & His Afro-Jamaican Rhythms released a ska version of the song as "Bonanza Ska" on Trojan Records in 1964. This version was later covered by Bad Manners (1989) and the Hurtin' Buckaroos (1997). Michael Richards, as Stanley Spadowski, sang a bit of the theme song while being held hostage by Channel 8's news goons in UHF (he did not know the words to the song he was originally supposed to sing, "Helter Skelter"). Michael Feinstein was the last to record the song in 2002 on his Songs of Evans and Livingston tribute CD. The Little House on the Prairie theme (also by Rose), was heard first in a 1971 episode of Bonanza. The overture for The High Chaparral composed by Harry Sukman can be heard briefly at the start of the 1966 episode "Four Sisters from Boston". On January 29, 2011, Marty Stuart and the Fabulous Superlatives performed the song on episode 56 of The Marty Stuart Show. The band often includes the song in their live shows.

Themes and social issues addressed 

Bonanza is uniquely known for having addressed racism, not typically covered on American television during the time period, from a compassionate, humanitarian point-of-view.

Bigotry, and  anti-semitism, was the subject of the episode "Look to the Stars" (Season 3, Episode 26; original air date March 18, 1962). A bigoted school teacher Mr. Norton (oblivious to his prejudice) routinely expels minority students. When he expels the brilliant Jewish student Albert Michelson, a scientific genius whose experiments on the streets of Virginia City often cause commotion, Ben Cartwright steps in and confronts Norton on his bigotry. Ashamed, the school teacher vows to reform.  A coda to the episode reveals that Michelson went on to win the Nobel Prize for Physics.

In the episode "Enter Thomas Bowers" (Season 5, Episode 30; original air date April 26, 1964), the Cartwright family helps the opera singer Bowers, an African American freedman, after he encounters prejudice while in Virginia City to perform. Bowers winds up arrested as a fugitive slave. At the beginning of the episode, Adam is shown to be outraged at the Supreme Court's Dred Scott v. Sandford decision (placing the time as 1857), which he discusses with his father.  According to David Dortort, sponsor General Motors was anxious about the episode. As producer, Dortort ensured that the episode re-aired during the summer rerun seasons, though two TV stations in the South refused to air it.

In the episode "The Wish", directed by Michael Landon, Hoss protects an African American former slave's family when confronted with racism after the American Civil War. In  "The Fear Merchants", discrimination against Chinese immigrants who attempt to assimilate in American society is addressed. "The Lonely Man" presents the controversial interracial marriage between the Cartwrights' longtime Chinese chef (Hop Sing) and a white woman (Missy).

Release

Broadcast history and ratings 

Initially, Bonanza aired on Saturdays at 7:30 p.m. Eastern, opposite Dick Clark's Saturday Night Beech-Nut Show and John Gunther's High Road on ABC, and Perry Mason on CBS. Bonanzas initial ratings were respectable, often coming in behind Mason but ahead of the ABC lineup. Ironically, executives considered canceling the show before its premiere because of its high cost. NBC kept it because Bonanza was one of the first series to be filmed and broadcast in color, including scenes of picturesque Lake Tahoe, Nevada. NBC's corporate parent, Radio Corporation of America (RCA), used the show to spur sales of RCA-manufactured color television sets (RCA was also the primary sponsor of the series during its first two seasons).

For Season 3, NBC moved Bonanza to Sundays at 9:00 pm Eastern with new sponsor Chevrolet (replacing The Dinah Shore Chevy Show). The new time slot caused Bonanza to soar in the ratings, and it eventually reached number one by 1964, an honor it would keep until 1967 when it was seriously challenged by the socially daring variety show, The Smothers Brothers Comedy Hour on CBS. By 1970, Bonanza was the first series to appear in the Top Five list for nine consecutive seasons (a record that would stand for many years) and thus established itself as the most consistent strong-performing hit television series of the 1960s. Bonanza remained high on the Nielsen ratings until 1971, when it finally fell out of the Top Ten.

During the summer of 1972, NBC broadcast reruns of episodes of the show from the 1967–1970 era on Tuesdays at 7:30 p.m. under the title Ponderosa while also rerunning more recent episodes on Sunday evenings in the shows normal time slot as Bonanza. In the fall of 1972, off-network episodes were released in broadcast syndication to local stations by NBC under the Ponderosa name.  After the series was canceled in 1973, the syndicated reruns reverted to the Bonanza name.

Home media 

A handful of early episodes have fallen into the public domain. These episodes have been released by several companies in different configurations, with substandard picture and sound quality, edited, and by legal necessity with the copyright-protected Evans–Livingston theme song replaced with generic western music.

In 1973, NBC sold its NBC Films syndication division, and with it the rights to the series, along with the rest of its pre-1973 library, to National Telefilm Associates, which changed its name to Republic Pictures in 1986. Republic would become part of the Spelling Entertainment organization in 1994 through Worldvision Enterprises. Select episodes ("The Best of Bonanza") were officially released in North America in 2003 on DVD through then-Republic video licensee Artisan Entertainment (which was later purchased by Lionsgate Home Entertainment). Republic (through CBS Media Ventures, which holds the television side of Republic's holdings) still retains the syndication distribution rights to the series. CBS Home Entertainment (under Paramount Home Media Distribution) is the official home video rights distributor at present.

Starting in September 2009, CBS Home Entertainment (distributed by Paramount) has to date released the first eleven seasons on DVD in Region 1. All episodes have been digitally remastered from original 35mm film elements to yield the best picture and sound quality possible with current technology. CBSHE has released each season in two-volume sets (available together and separately). Each and every set contains exclusive multiple and rare bonus features, more than any other vintage long-running television series released on DVD. Classic series collections usually have bonus features included with the first season release only, if at all. On May 23, 2023, the remaining seasons 12, 13 and 14 will be released, as will a box set of the complete series containing all 431 episodes.

In Region 2, AL!VE AG released the first seven seasons on DVD in Germany between 2008 and 2010.  These releases are now out of print as AL!VE has lost the rights.  In 2011, StudioCanal acquired the rights to the series and have begun re-releasing it on DVD, and all seasons have now been released but have not been remastered.

Episodes of the series have also been officially released as part-works on DVD in France and the United Kingdom.

Bonanza "the official first season" was released in Scandinavia during 2010. The first season is released in 4 volumes. The first two volumes were released on October 20, 2010, and the second two volumes on April 27, 2011.

Addition: As of Nov, 24th 2017, the whole series was released on Region2-DVDs. ASIN:B075R74H2T

Cancellation 

In the fall of 1972, NBC moved Bonanza to Tuesday nights – where reruns from the 1967–1970 period had been broadcast the previous summer under the title The Ponderosa – opposite the All in the Family spinoff show, Maude, which was a virtual death sentence for the program. The scheduling change, as well as Dan Blocker's death in May 1972, resulted in plunging ratings for the show. David Canary returned to his former role of Candy (to offset Hoss' absence), and a new character named Griff King (played by Tim Matheson) was added in an attempt to lure younger viewers. Griff, in prison for nearly killing his abusive stepfather, was paroled into Ben's custody and given a job as a ranch hand. Several episodes were built around his character, one that Matheson never had a chance to fully develop before the show was abruptly cancelled in November 1972 (with the final episode airing January 16, 1973). Many fans, as well as both Landon and Greene, felt that the character of Hoss was essential, as he was a nurturing, empathetic soul who rounded out the all-male cast.

For 14 years, Bonanza was the premier western on American television; Reruns of the series have aired on several cable networks such as TV Land, INSP, Family Channel, the Hallmark Channel and Great American Country. The series is currently seen on MeTV, TV Land, INSP, Circle and Encore Westerns. TV Land airs Bonanza from only the first season to the 1969–1970 season. INSP initially broadcast only selected first and second-season episodes of Bonanza and began to air the Bonanza "Lost Episodes" packages which contain episodes  from 1965 to 1973. The Family Channel and the Hallmark Channel are two other cable networks that have also broadcast the Bonanza Lost Episodes package. In October 2015, MeTV began showing the Bonanza Lost Episodes package. Beginning in  March 2018, MeTV has been airing the Lost Episodes, and repeating all 14 seasons of the series from beginning to end.

Other media information

Television movies 
Bonanza was revived for a series of three made-for-television movies featuring the Cartwrights' children: Bonanza: The Next Generation (1988), Bonanza: The Return (1993), and Bonanza: Under Attack (1995). Michael Landon Jr. played Little Joe's son Benji while Gillian Greene, Lorne Greene's daughter, played a love interest. In the second movie, airing on NBC, a one-hour retrospective was done to introduce the drama. It was hosted by both Michael Landon Jr. and Dirk Blocker, who looks and sounds almost exactly like his father, Dan Blocker, albeit without his father's towering height. According to the magazine TV Guide, producer David Dortort told Blocker he was too old to play the Hoss scion, but gave him the role of an unrelated newspaper reporter. Clips of the younger Blocker's appearance and voice were heavily used in advertisements promoting the "second generation" theme, perhaps misleading audiences to believe that Blocker was playing Hoss' heir. Hoss' son Josh was born out of wedlock, as it is explained that Hoss drowned without knowing his fiancėe was pregnant. Such a storyline might have been problematic in the original series. (The Big Valley, however, had a major character in Heath, who was presented as illegitimate.) The Gunsmoke movies of the early 1990s employed a similar theme when Marshal Matt Dillon learned he had sired Michael Learned's character's daughter in a short-lived romance. The initial story was first introduced in 1973, when depiction of fornication courted protests, so CBS insisted their hero Matt have the encounter when he had amnesia. As was the style of television westerns, gunfights played a major role in the movies which featured notoriously inaccurate shooting as well as unlimited ammunition.

Prequel 

In 2001, there was an attempt to revive the Bonanza concept with a prequel, Ponderosa – not to be confused with the 1972 summer reruns under the same title – with a pilot directed by Simon Wincer and filmed in Australia. Covering the time when the Cartwrights first arrived at the Ponderosa, when Adam and Hoss were teenagers and Joe a little boy, the series lasted 20 episodes and featured less gunfire and brawling than the original. Bonanza creator David Dortort approved PAX TV (now Ion TV)'s decision to hire Beth Sullivan, formerly of Dr. Quinn, Medicine Woman, which some believe gave the series more depth as well as a softer edge. The Hop Sing character is depicted not only as a cook but also a family counselor and herbal healer. The series takes place in Nevada Territory in 1849, which is actually an anachronism.  The Nevada Territory did not split from the Utah Territory until 1861, meaning that until at least the 5th season (the episode "Enter Thomas Bowers" establishes that year as 1857), Bonanza is also set in what in real life would have been Utah Territory.

Bonanza merchandise 

Bonanza has had a highly profitable merchandising history. Currently, Bonanza Ventures, Inc. grants merchandising and licensing rights worldwide. The original series has spawned several successful novelty western/folk albums from 1962 to 1965 including "Bonanza, Christmas on the Ponderosa" which charted at #35 on Billboard'''s Christmas Record album chart; three dozen Dell and Gold Key comic books from 1962 through 1970; a short-lived comic book adaptation by Dutch comics artist Hans G. Kresse between 1965 and 1966, Jim Beam Whiskey Ponderosa Ranch decanters 1964–1966; a series of "Big-Little" books from 1966 to 1969; Revel Bonanza model character sets from 1966 to 1968; a chain of Bonanza and Ponderosa steakhouses from 1963–present; the Lake Tahoe-based "Ponderosa" theme park from 1967 to 2004; a line of American Character action figures in 1966–1967; Aladdin lunch buckets and thermos bottles in 1966–1968; View Master slide sets in 1964, 1971; Ponderosa tin cups from 1967 to 2004; a series of Hamilton collector plates in 1989–1990; and most recently, Breyer Fiftieth Anniversary Ponderosa Stable sets, with horses and Cartwright figures in 2009–2011.

Fourteen Bonanza novels have been published: 
 Bonanza: A Novel by Noel Loomis (1960);
 Bonanza: One Man With Courage by Thomas Thompson (1966);
 Bonanza: Killer Lion by Steve Frazee (1966);
 Bonanza: Treachery Trail by Harry Whittington (1968);
 Winter Grass by Dean Owen (1968);
 Ponderosa Kill by Dean Owen (1968);
 The Pioneer Spirit by Stephen Calder (1988);
 The Ponderosa Empire by Stephen Calder (1991);
 Bonanza: The High Steel Hazard by Stephen Calder (1993);
 Journey of the Horse by Stephen Calder (1993);
 The Money Hole by Stephen Calder (1993);
 The Trail to Timberline by Stephen Calder (1994);
 Bonanza: Felling of the Sons by Monette L. Bebow-Reinhard (2005),
 Bonanza: Mystic Fire by Monette L. Bebow-Reinhard (2009).

There is also a collection of Bonanza stories: The Best of Bonanza World: A Book of Favorite Stories, published by CreateSpace Independent Publishing Platform (2012), and in the late 1960s-early 1970s, Whitman Books published several hardcover novels aimed at young readers, such as Killer Lion by Steve Frazer (1966). Bonanza Gold (2003–2009), a quarterly magazine, featured detailed information about the show, including interviews with guest actors and other production personnel, articles about historical events and people depicted in the series, fan club information, and fan fiction.  Seasons 1–11 (as of 10/2020) are available on DVD, as well as several non-successive public-domain episodes (sans original theme music). The prequel series, The Ponderosa, as well as the three sequel movies (see below), are all available on DVD.

 Legacy 

 In American Desperado, co-authored by Jon Roberts (né John Riccobono) and author Evan Wright, Roberts shares in Chapter 3 that he missed Sea Hunt and Bonanza. Roberts repeats this explanation for his name change in other media, as well, such as the documentary Cocaine Cowboys.
 In the TV series Maverick episode "Three Queens Full" Bart (Jack Kelly) is blackmailed by Joe Wheelwright (Jim Backus), owner of the Subrosa ranch, into escorting mail order brides for Wheelwright's three sons Aaron, Moose and Small Paul.

 Accolades 
 Awards and nominations 

 Other honors 

 See also 
 1959 in television

 Citations 

 General bibliography 
 Bonanza: A Viewers Guide to the TV Legend by David Greenland. 167 pages. Publisher: Crosslines Inc (June 1997). .
 A Reference Guide to Television's Bonanza: Episodes, Personnel, and Broadcast History by Bruce R. Leiby and Linda F. Leiby. 384 pages. Publisher: McFarland (March 1, 2005). .
 Bonanza: The Definitive Ponderosa Companion'' by Melany Shapiro. 176 pages. Publisher: Cyclone Books; illustrated edition (September 1997). .

External links 

 
 Bonanza on TVGuide.com
 Bonanza at the Internet Archive
 Bonanza on TVLand.com
 Bonanza at the Encyclopedia of Television
 Bonanza at Fiftiesweb.com
 Bonanza at EpisodeWorld.com
 Bonanza: Scenery of The Ponderosa
 Bonanza Episode Guide at TV Gems

 
1950s Western (genre) television series
1959 American television series debuts
1960s Western (genre) television series
1970s Western (genre) television series
1973 American television series endings
English-language television shows
NBC original programming
Nielsen ratings winners
Television series by CBS Studios
Television series by Universal Television
Television series set in the 1860s
Television shows adapted into comics
Television shows adapted into novels
Television shows set in Nevada